Joo Soon-ahn (also known as Ju Sun-an, born 7 August 1970) is a South Korean sailor. She competed in the 1996 Summer Olympics and the 2000 Summer Olympics.

References

External links
 
 
 

1970 births
Living people
South Korean windsurfers
Female windsurfers
South Korean female sailors (sport)
Olympic sailors of South Korea
Sailors at the 1996 Summer Olympics – Mistral One Design
Sailors at the 2000 Summer Olympics – Mistral One Design
Asian Games bronze medalists for South Korea
Asian Games medalists in sailing
Sailors at the 1990 Asian Games
Sailors at the 1994 Asian Games
Sailors at the 1998 Asian Games
Medalists at the 1990 Asian Games
Medalists at the 1994 Asian Games